Anita Monro is an Australian academic, theologian, and Uniting Church in Australia minister. She is the Principal of Grace College, one of the residential colleges of the University of Queensland, located on the St Lucia campus. She is also an Honorary Senior Fellow, in the School of Historical and Philosophical Inquiry, Faculty of Humanities and Social Sciences, at the University of Queensland.

Early life and education 
Monro completed a Bachelor of Arts at the University of Queensland, a Bachelor of Letters (Honours) at Deakin University, a Bachelor of Theology from the Brisbane College of Theology, and a Doctor of Philosophy at Griffith University in 1999. Her doctoral thesis, based on the work of French philosopher Julia Kristeva was titled, Subjecting ambiguity: towards a poststructuralist feminist theological methodology. Her doctoral supervisor was Australian theologian Elaine Wainwright.

Career 
Monro has taught in the disciplines of Biblical Studies (Hermeneutics), Systematic Theology, Practical Theology (Liturgy) and Philosophy at Brisbane College of Theology, Sydney College of Divinity, and United Theological College (Sydney) (2003-2009), which was affiliated with Charles Sturt University (School of Theology).

Monro has published in the areas of Christian theology, public worship and feminist theology, with a particular focus on the Australian context.

Monro is a Minister of the Word in the Uniting Church in Australia, and was ordained on 10 December 1988. She has served congregations in both Queensland and New South Wales. She has also served on National Working Groups on Worship and Doctrine and Gospel and Gender. She contributed to the Uniting Church's worship book, Uniting in Worship 2, published in 2005. In 2012, she was a candidate for President elect for the Uniting Church in Australia.

Monro has been a member of the four-person editorial collective for the Seachanges journal since its inception.

In addition to being an Honorary Senior Fellow at the University of Queensland, Monro is the Principal of Grace College, a residential college, which has links to the Uniting Church, the Presbyterian Church and the University of Queensland.

Selected works

Books 
 Stephen Burns and Anita Monro eds. (2015). Public theology and the challenge of feminism. Gender, theology, and spirituality, Abingdon, Oxon, United Kingdom: Routledge. 
 Stephen Burns and Anita Monro eds. (2009). Christian worship in Australia: inculturating the liturgical tradition. Strathfield, NSW, Australia: St Pauls Publications. 
 Monro, Anita (2006). Resurrecting erotic transgression: subjecting ambiguity in theology. London & Oakville: Equinox Publishing.

Book chapters 
 Monro, Anita J. (2021). A Kaleidoscopic Vessel Sailing on a Kyriarchal Ocean: The Third Wave Feminist Theologies of Women-Church (1987-2007). In: Theological and Hermeneutical Explorations from Australia: Horizons of Contextuality. (pp. 25–42) edited by Jione Havea. Lanham, Maryland, United States: The Rowman & Littlefield Publishing.   
 Monro, Anita (2020). Grace-fully engaging young adults. In: Open and relational leadership: leading with love. (pp. 225–229) edited by Roland Hearn, Sheri D. Kling and Thomas Jay Oord. Grasmere, ID, United States: SacraSage Press. 
 Ayre, Clive W., Bookless, Dave, Geyer, Colleen, Monro, Anita and Reichardt, David (2016). Ecology and service (Diakonia): Putting words into action. In: The Church in God's Household: Protestant Perspectives on Ecclesiology and Ecology. (pp. 54–74) edited by Clive W. Ayre and Ernst M. Conradie. Pietermaritzburg, South Africa: Cluster Publications. 
 Burns, Stephen and Monro, Anita (2015). Which public?: inspecting the house of public theology. In: Public theology and the challenge of feminism. (pp. 1–14) edited by Stephen Burns and Anita Monro. Abingdon, Oxon, United Kingdom: Routledge.  
 Monro, Anita (2014). A thin piercing lament: the call of God to Elijah in/to/for community. In: Witness the Glory of God in the face of Jesus Christ: papers in honour of Dean Drayton. (pp. 162–172) edited by Christopher C. Walker. Unley, SA, Australia: MediaCom Education. 
 Monro, Anita (2014). Of frogs, eels, women, and pelicans: the myth of Tiddalik and the importance of ambiguity in baptismal identity for the contemporary Christian church. In: Worship and Culture: Foreign Country or Homeland?. (pp. 320–334) edited by Gláucia Vasconcelos Wilkey. Grand Rapids, MI, United States: Wm. B. Eerdmans Publishing. 
 Monro, Anita (2010). 'And ain’t I a woman': the phronetic dramaturgy of feeding the family. In: Presiding Like A Woman. (pp. 123–132) edited by Nicola Slee and Stephen Burns. London UK: SPCK Publishing. 
 Monro, Anita (2010). Pursuing feminist research: perspectives and methodologies. In: Researching practice: a discourse on qualitative methodologies. (pp. 289–298) edited by Joy Higgs, Nita Cherry, Rob Macklin and Rola Ajjawi. Rotterdam, The Netherlands: Sense Publishers. 
 Monro, Anita (2001) When the "Good" is Not Enough: The Jouissance of Watching/Reading from/for the Subjection of Ambiguity, In: Biezeveld, Kune, and Anne-Claire Mulder. In: Towards a Different Transcendence : Feminist Findings on Subjectivity, Religion, and Values. Religions and Discourse, V. 9. Oxford: P. Lang, 2001.

Journal articles 
 Monro, Anita (2017). :It's such a shame you're not in a Congregation!": Reclaiming the Ordered Ministry of the Word in the Uniting Church. Uniting Church Studies, 21 (1), 31-38. 
 Monro, Anita (2014). Experiencing good worship?. Liturgy, 29 (2), 9-13. 
 Monro, Anita and Somasundram, Drene (2013). "Thirdspace’ engenders theological education." The International Journal of Religion and Spirituality in Society, 2 (3), 55-68. 
 Monro, Anita (2010). "A View from the Antipodes. Juxtaposing dingo and baby: a consideration of the cycle of light in the Australian summer." Studia Liturgica, 40 (1-2), 94-101. 
 Monro, A (2001). "Deconstruction, feminist theology, and the problem of difference: Subverting the race/gender divide". Australian Feminist Studies, 16 (35), 254-255.

References 

Living people
Academic staff of the University of Queensland
Uniting Church in Australia ministers
Griffith University alumni
Christian feminist theologians
Australian women academics
Year of birth missing (living people)